Roberts Farm Site (36LA1) is a historic archaeological site located above the Conestoga River at Manor Township in Lancaster County, Pennsylvania. It underwent excavation in 1931-1932 and in 1971 by the Pennsylvania Historic and Museum Commission.  The excavations identified the presence of a substantial, fortified Susquehannock Indian village and cemetery from the Late Woodland / Protohistoric period.  Settlement was from the Late Archaic period through about 1650.

It was listed on the National Register of Historic Places in 1986.

References 

Archaeological sites in Lancaster County, Pennsylvania
Archaeological sites on the National Register of Historic Places in Pennsylvania
National Register of Historic Places in Lancaster County, Pennsylvania
Native American history of Pennsylvania
Susquehannock